Lieutenant-Colonel Sir Donald Moyle Field  (19 November 1881 – 11 November 1956) was an officer of the British Indian Army and Indian Political Department who served as Chief Minister of the princely state of Jodhpur from 1935 to 1946, the last of the British Raj leaders of that area. Among the events of Field's ministry was the 1937 order formally granting the request of Mali community of Rajputana to be renamed as "Saini" or "Sainik Kshatriya" in official records.

References

History of Jodhpur
Companions of the Order of the Star of India
Year of birth unknown
Year of death unknown
Knights Bachelor
Indian Political Service officers
British Indian Army officers
People educated at Tonbridge School
Graduates of the Royal Military College, Sandhurst
1881 births
1956 deaths
British people in colonial India